The 1947 Jarrow by-election was held on 7 May 1947.  The byelection was held due to the death of the incumbent Labour MP, Ellen Wilkinson.  It was won by the Labour candidate Ernest Fernyhough.

References

Jarrow by-election
Jarrow by-election
Jarrow by-election
20th century in County Durham
Jarrow by-election, 1947
By-elections to the Parliament of the United Kingdom in County Durham constituencies
Jarrow